Rick Leach and Jared Palmer were the defending champions, but Palmer did not compete this year. Leach teamed up with Scott Melville and lost in the quarterfinals to Kelly Jones and David Pate.

Jim Grabb and Patrick McEnroe won the title by defeating Alex O'Brien and Sandon Stolle 3–6, 7–5, 6–0 in the final.

Seeds

Draw

Draw

References

External links
 Official results archive (ATP)
 Official results archive (ITF)

1995 ATP Tour
SAP Open